The MTV Video Music Award for Best Latin was first introduced to the MTV Video Music Awards in 2010 under the name  tr3́s Latino Artist of the Year. The winner was chosen by the viewers voting on MTV Tr3s' official website. The winner, however, does not receive the award at the main ceremony and in later years was announced during the Spanish-language rebroadcast of the award ceremony on tr3́s. This category were rewarded from 2006 to 2009 in Los Premios MTV Latinoamérica.

Los Premios MTV Latinoamérica

MTV Video Music Awards

See also 
 MTV Europe Music Award for Best Latin

MTV Video Music Awards
Awards established in 2010
Awards disestablished in 2013